The 1981–82 Kansas Jayhawks men's basketball team represented the University of Kansas during the 1981–82 NCAA Division I men's basketball season.

Roster
Dave Magley
Tony Guy
Kelly Knight
Jeff Dishman
Tyke Peacock
Lance Hill
Brian Martin
Tad Boyle
Mark Summers
Mark Ewing
Tim Banks
Ron McHenry

Schedule

References

Kansas Jayhawks men's basketball seasons
Kansas
Kansas Jay
Kansas Jay